Arnon may refer to:

 Wadi Mujib, river and wadi in Jordan, historically known as Arnon
 Arnon (river), river in central France

People 
 Avraham Arnon (1887 - 1960), Israeli educator and a recipient of the Israel Prize
 Baruch Arnon (born 1940), Jewish American pianist and music teacher
 Daniel I. Arnon (1910 - 1994) was a biologist who is associated with photosynthesis and plant nutrition
 Itzhak Arnon (1909 - 2005), Israeli agronomist
 Poj Arnon (born 1970), Thai film director
 Ruth Arnon (born 1933), Israeli biochemist
 Yigal Arnon (1929 - 2014), Israeli lawyer